The Scandinavian Coldblood Trotter consists of two closely related and interconnected breeds of trotting horse: the Norsk Kaldblodstraver or Norwegian Coldblood Trotter and the Svensk Kallblodstravare, the Swedish Coldblood Trotter or North Swedish Trotter. Coldblood trotters are the result of cross-breeding native coldblooded farm horses – in Norway the Dølehest, in Sweden the North Swedish Horse – with lighter and faster horses. Although the Norwegian and Swedish coldblood trotters are substantially considered a single breed, two national stud-books are maintained, and registration requirements differ in some respects between the two countries.

History 

The Scandinavian Coldblood Trotter is the result of cross-breeding of native coldblooded farm horses – in Norway the Dølehest, in Sweden the North Swedish Horse – with lighter and faster horses. Stud-books were started in 1939 in Norway and in 1964 in Sweden. From about 1950 inter-breeding between the two breeds began, to the point that they are now substantially considered to be a single breed.

Both national types are endangered. In 2012 there were  mares and 100 stallions of the Norwegian breed; by 2019 those numbers had fallen to 764 and 64, for a total breeding stock of 828 head. The conservation status of both is reported to DAD-IS as 'at risk/endangered'.

Characteristics 

Bay in all its variations is the most common coat colour, followed by chestnut and black. The dun gene and cream gene are present in the genetic material, but not white nor any variations of pinto.

The Coldblood Trotter has a relatively small and square head with large nostrils. It is well suited for the cold conditions in Scandanivia, and it can develop large amounts of winter hair, having less need for blankets in winter. Compared to the Standardbred it is smaller, heavier, and more compact in build. It is not as fast as the Standardbred. The Coldblood Trotter is mostly bred in Norway and Sweden.  Coldblood Trotters are very rarely found outside the Nordic countries.

Uses 

The coldblood trotter is bred for use in harness racing. The two types compete in shared heats that exclude entry of light trotter breeds or Finnhorses.

References 

Horse breeds
Horse breeds originating in Sweden
Harness racing in Sweden
Harness racing in Norway
Horse breeds originating in Norway